The Ambassador of Italy to the Ottoman Empire (in Turkish, İtalya'nın Osmanlı İmparatorluğu Büyükelçisi) is the head of the diplomatic mission of the Kingdom of Italy in the Ottoman Empire.

List 
The following is a list of Italian ambassadors in the Ottoman Empire.

Italian High Commissioner to the Ottoman Empire 
At the end of the First World War, as decreed by the armistice of Mudros, the Ottoman Empire was dismembered and the capital Constantinople occupied by the allied powers.

References

External links 

 Official website of the Italian Embassy in Ankara (in Italian) (in Turkish), on ambankara.esteri.it.

 
Ottoman Empire